Among the places of worship in the town and area of Malvern, Worcestershire are centres of dedication to many faiths and denominations. The town has 31 Christian churches with 11 belonging to the Church of England, ranging from low church to high Anglo-Catholic, two Roman Catholic, one Evangelical, and the others being  Non-Conformist and other faiths. Its oldest place of worship is the almost cathedral sized parish church of Great Malvern Priory which is all that remains of the former 10th century abbey in central Malvern, which according to the Worcester Monastic Annals, work began in 1085. The chain of Malvern Hills lies in a north-south  direction, thus posing a challenge for the architects of Christian churches located on the steep slopes, chancels being traditionally  sited at the east end of the building. Many churches were built in the 19th century concomitant with the rapid expansion of the town due to  its popularity as a spa. A few modern buildings such as St Mary's Church (1960) in Sherrard's Green, have been constructed in  the  second half of the 20th century, and some churches, notably St Andrews in  Poolbrook, have had important modern extensions added during the first decade of the 21st century.

As of 2022 there are no facilities for other faiths in Malvern. A synagogue in Worcester was created by Ashkenazi Orthodox evacuees from Birmingham during World War II. However, by 1973 the community had become so small it was not possible obtain a minyan and the remaining members voted the community out of existence. The nearest synagogues are the four in Birmingham. The small Three Counties Liberal Jewish Community serves Gloucestershire, Herefordshire and Worcestershire holding services in various locations throughout the counties. 
 There are two established mosques in Worcester serving the Muslim community. The nearest Sikh gurdwaras are located in Birmingham, Smethwick, and Leamington. Hindu temples for the region and the nearest venues for other faiths  are mainly in the Birmingham - Black Country - Coventry area.

All institutions are listed in alphabetical order by faith, denomination and facility. Some link to their more complete Wikipedia pages.

Church  of England

All Saints Church

Style of worship: Open evangelical
All Saints remains as one of two C of  E churches in  Malvern Wells following  the closure of St Peter's Gothic style church designed by  Robert Jearrad (1836). Built in 1930 in 13th-century  style in  Malvern rag-stone  by  architect Troyte Griffith of Nevinson  & Newton, to whom Sir Edward Elgar dedicated an Enigma Variation, it  is located on steep sloping common land donated by  Lady Emily Foley, it has a semicircular apsidal chancel which demonstrates the architectural challenges of east-facing chancels on the flanks of the Malvern Hills, and an organ by Nicholsons.
Location: Wells Road, The Wyche, Malvern Wells
Built: 1903
Architecture: 13th-century style.
Architect: Troyte Griffith
Organ: Nicholson & Co Ltd.
Bells: One, in  a small  turret.
Notable people in cemetery:
Parish:Malvern Wells and Wyche
Incumbent: Dave Bruce (Chase Team Rector) 
Website: All Saints, Malvern Wells
Further reading: Roden, Hugh C. B. (1923) A guide to All Saints' Church, the Wyche, Malvern. W. H. Lovel, Malvern. OL17391375M

Great Malvern Priory, Church of St Mary & St Michael

Style of worship: Anglican. Holy Communion (Book of Common Prayer)
Location: Church Street, Great Malvern
Built: from 1085
Architecture: Norman, and 1440 Perpendicular. Grade 1, one of the largest non-cathedral parish churches in England. 15th century stained glass windows.
Organ: 1875 Nicholson & Co Ltd. Refurbished  Rushworth and Dreaper in 1927 and 1977, and again by Nicholons in 2003. A Certified Historic Organ.
Bells: 10, being a ring of eight with a flat 4th, earliest dating from c1380.
Notable people in cemetery: Anne Darwin, daughter of Charles Darwin.
Parish: Great Malvern, Deanery of Malvern and Upton. 
Incumbent: The Revd Rod Corke, Vicar
Website: Great Malvern Priory

Christ Church

Style of worship: Standard Church Of England liturgy, 'relaxed and informal'.
Location:  Avenue Road, Great Malvern, within  200 metres of Great Malvern station and Malvern St James independent girls school.
Parish: Christ Church. 
Built: 1875, the church  is a Grade II listed building, and an English Heritage grant  (2015) aided place of worship,  
Architecture: Designed and built by T D Barry & Sons of Liverpool to seat 700 people, its architecture is based on pure 14th century Gothic style with  a 55-metre spire and an east  window by Charles Eomer Kemp.
Organ: 1,486 pipe organ constructed by Nicholsons of Malvern in 1884, restored and repaired in 1971 and 1986.  
Bells: Two  bells in  the tower, a 6 cwt  in C, and a 7 cwt in D were cast by John Taylor & Co, Loughborough in 1875. 
Notable people in graveyard: The church  does not  have its own graveyard; burials take place in the nearby Great  Malvern cemetery in Madresfield Road.
Incumbent: vacant (2022).
Website: Christ Church, Malvern

Church of the Ascension

Style of worship: 'Forward-looking Church of England using a modern Catholic liturgy based on an inclusive, liberal theology'.  
Location: Somers Park Avenue, Link Top. 
Parish: Malvern Link with Cowleigh. One of the three churches in the parish that also includes St Matthias' Church in Malvern Link and St Peter's Church in Cowleigh. 
Built: 1903. Grade II listed building (1991)
Architecture: Early  English Gothic by Gothic revival  architect Sir Walter Tapper, his first  church. Early English style in Cotswold stone with lancet windows,  featuring a stone relief of the Ascension by Harry Hems. Modeled on a 13th century Cistercian monastery, the building  is noted for its acoustics and is a regular venue for choirs and Gregorian chants.
Bells: none. The former two bells were sold in the 1960s to raise funds
Notable people in cemetery: no consecrated cemetery
Current incumbent: As of 22 April 2018, The Rev. Phillip Johnson, vicar
Affiliations: Progressive Christianity Network Britain.
Church web site: The Ascension Centre for Contemplation and Reconciliation
Parish website: Malvern Link with Cowleigh

Holy Trinity

Location: Link Top, North Malvern
Parish: North Malvern
Built: 1850-51  as a Chapel of Ease to Malvern Priory, It became its own parish in 1869. Expanded 1872, 1896-7, 1908-9 (Grade II Listed[) 
Architecture: Early Decorated/Early English by Samuel Daukes, London, with influences of the Oxford Movement
Bells: 2
Organ by Nicholson & Co Ltd of Worcester, 1878. Later organs (electronic), 1975, 1988, by Makin Organs
Notable people in cemetery:
Current incumbent: , Rev Rebecca Elliott, vicar
Website: holytrinitymalvern.

St Andrew's Church

Style of worship: Open evangelical
Location: Poolbrook
Parish: Malvern Wells and Wyche
Built:1882 by Sir Arthur Blomfield in memory of a member of the Chance Brothers glassware family.
Architecture: by G. Lewis Sheppard in13th century style (Early English).
Bells: 1
Notable people in cemetery:
Current incumbent: Dave Bruce (Chase Team Rector)
Website: St Andrew's and All Saints

St Giles Church (Little Malvern Priory)

Style of worship: 
Location: Little Malvern 
Grade I listed (1968)
Parish Little Malvern, 
Built: 1125
Architecture: was part of a Benedictine Priory founded in 1171. 14th - 15th century 15 and has some Norman remains.
Bells: 1 by John of Gloucester ca. 1354
Organ: 1882 by William Hill & Sons, London. Refurbished 2018-19 by Nicholson & Co Ltd
Windows: Stained glass, 1480
Notable people in cemetery:
Current incumbent: Revd. Stephen Sealy (Non-Stipendiary Incumbent)
Website: Little Malvern Priory

St James's

Style of worship: 
Location: West Malvern
Parish: West Malvern St. James (Benefice of Malvern Holy Trinity and St James West Malvern), Archdeaconry & Diocese of Worcester. Originally  'Mathon St. James',   renamed 1844
Grade II  listed (1949)
Built:1885
Architecture: 13th century style (Early English). Malvern ragstone with ashlar dressings 
Bells:1
Notable people in cemetery: Peter Mark Roget (1869) of Roget's Thesaurus
Current incumbent: The Revd Rebecca Elliott, vicar (as of January 2021)
Website: A Church Near You, St James and Facebook

St Leonard

Style of worship: High Church (Anglo-Catholic). Built as an Anglo-Catholic church and maintains its tradition of Oxford Movement ceremony, liturgy and worship  
Location: Newland
Parish: Former parish church of Newland, in 1998 it became the private chapel of the Beauchamp Community. Open to everyone.
Built:1862. Grade I listed
Architecture: 14th century style by Philip Hardwick(p. 17),  Gambier Parry fresco technique by Clayton and Bell
Bells:
Notable people in cemetery:
Current incumbent: Fr. Iain William Forbes , Chaplain
Website: beauchampstleonard

St Mary's Church, Pickersleigh 
Location: Sherrards Green Road, Malvern
Parish: Pickersleigh (a new parish created in September 2014). 
Built: 1958, originally as a chapel of ease for Christchurch to serve the many council estates in the area.
Architecture: Mid 20th century
Bells: None
Notable people in cemetery: No cemetery.
Current incumbent (2020): The Rev. Lynne Sparkes, vicar
Website: St Mary's Church, Pickersliegh

St Mary  the Virgin

Location: Guarlford Road, Guarlford
Style of worship: BCP with hymns and Common Worship
Parish: First built as St Mary's Barnards Green, a chapel of ease of Great Malvern Priory. Parish Church in 1866. Benefice of Powick and Guarlford and Madresfield with Newland, 1999. 
Built:1844 by George McCann, Malvern. Grade II listed
Architecture: designed by Thomas Bellamy of London.
Bells: none
Notable people in cemetery:
Current vicar/priest/minister: The Rev. Gary Crellin, Rector  (as of 2020)
Websites: Guarlford parish, and Parishes of Powick, Guarlford, Madresfield, Newland

St Matthias' Church

Style of worship: 'Forward-looking Church of England using a modern Catholic liturgy based on an inclusive, liberal theology'.  
Location: Church Road, Malvern Link
Parish: Malvern Link with Cowleigh
Built:1844 by Mc.Cann, Malvern. Tower added 1898-9 by  Collins & Godfrey of Tewkesbury.  Grade II Listed
Architecture:  Designed by Sir George Gilbert Scott, and Harvey Eginton of Worcester
Bells: 10, cast  by John Taylor & Co of Loughborough. #10  in 1899, 3 to 9 in 1900 and  #1 and 2  added in 1994. The Tenor weighs 16 cwt  and is tuned to F#. The first  full  peal of Grandsire Triples was rung  on 1 June 1901 in St Matthias See also: Stedman Triples rung at  St  Matthias
Notable people in cemetery:
Incumbent: As of 22 April 2018, The Rev. Phillip Johnson, vicar
Affiliations: Progressive Christianity Network Britain.
Website: St Mathias' Church
Parish website: Malvern Link with Cowleigh

St Peter's Church, Cowleigh

Style of worship: 'Forward-looking Church of England using a modern Catholic liturgy based on an inclusive, liberal theology'.  
Location: Cowleigh Bank, North Malvern
Parish: 	Malvern Link with Cowleigh
Built:. 1865 II listed 
Architecture: George Edmund Street, designed in the High Church Anglican tradition. 
Bells:
Notable people in cemetery:
Incumbent: As of 22 April 2018, The Rev. Phillip Johnson, vicar
Affiliations: Progressive Christianity Network Britain.
Parish website: Malvern Link with Cowleigh

Protestant, Reformist, other denominations

Baptist

Malvern Baptist Church
Style of worship: Baptist
Location: Abbey Road, Great Malvern
Affiliation: Heart of England Baptist Association / Baptist Union of Great Britain.
Built:1894.
Architecture: Traditional church building in Victorian non-conformist geometric gothic style by George Ingall of Birmingham.
Bells: None
Notable people in cemetery: No consecrated churchyard
Current incumbent: Rev Dave Clarke, minister (as of 2020)
Website: Malvern Baptist Church

United Reformed Church

Malvern Link, Worcester Road
Founded 1903 as Malvern Link Free Church (Countess of Huntingdon's Connexion)
Parish/Affiliation: The West Midlands Synod
Minister: Reverend Ken Martin (as of 2020)
Web site: URC in  Malvern Link

Holly Mount

Founded 1876 
Relocated 2019 to hold Sunday worship at The Cube, Albert Road North, a community centre, with other activities held at the URC Church in Malvern Link and the Lyttelton Well Rooms in Malvern. 
Organisation/Affiliation: Malvern and Worcester team pastorate
Minister: 
Web site: Holly Mount Church 
In July 2021, plans were announced to convert the former Holly Mount church building on Queen's Drive for residential use.

Non aligned
Eden Church
Repurposed: 2010
Leader: Mike Dibbens 
Location: Eden Centre (since 2015), Grovewood Road, Malvern
Website: Eden Church

Evangelical

Malvern Evangelical Church,

Location: 204-208 Pickersleigh Road, Malvern WR14 2QX
Built:1975
Architecture: Late 20th century.
Current vicar/priest/minister: 
Website: Malvern Evangelical Church

Catholic

St Joseph's Church
 
Style of worship: Roman Catholic
Location: 1245 Newtown Road, Link Top, Malvern, WR14 1PF
Parish: St Joseph, Malvern. Archdiocese of Birmingham
Built: 1876. Expanded: 1997
Architecture: 
Incumbent: Fr Naz Mgungwe, parish priest (as at 2020)
Website: St Joseph's, Malvern

St Wulstan's Roman Catholic Church

Style of worship: Mass, Adoration. Benedictine with Gregorian Chant. Sacrosanctum Concilium ( Vatican 2 Decree on the Liturgy)
Location: Wells Rd, Little Malvern, Worcestershire WR14 4JL,
Parish: St  Wulstan, Catholic Diocese of Birmingham  (Worcester Deanery),
Built: 1862. Major restoration  2003/4 aided by  a grant  from English Heritage.
Architecture: 13th century French Gothic style.
Bells:
Organ:  1841 by John Nicholson. Refurbished/restored  1974, 1981, 2017
Notable people in cemetery: Sir Edward Elgar, English composer; Dorothy Howell, English composer
Incumbent: Fr Edward Crouzet, parish priest (as at 2020)
Website: St Wulstan's Church in Little Malvern

Christadelphian

Style of worship: Christadelphianism / Biblical unitarianism
Christadelphian Hall
Location: 21 Abbey Road, Great Malvern
Incumbent: Christadelphians ("ecclesias") do not have  permanently appointed preachers
Website: Malvern Christadelphians

Interdenominational
Wyche Free Church
Style of worship: independent evangelical church
Location: Jubilee Drive, Upper Colwall, Malvern
Founded: ca. 1850
Parish: self-governing
Affiliation: FIEC - Fellowship of Independent Evangelical Churches
Built: present church built in 1910
Architecture: 
Bells:
Notable people in cemetery: No consecrated churchyard
Elders (2020): Peter Goodbury, Rev John Grindell.  Pastor: None (2020), weekly ministry of experienced visiting preachers.
Website: Wyche Free Church

Methodist

Landsdowne Crescent Methodist  Church

Style of worship: Methodist
Location: Great Malvern, Landsdown Crescent
Parish: South West Worcestershire Circuit
Built: 1866
Architecture: Gothic Revival, by John Tarring of London.
Bells:
Notable people in cemetery:
Current vicar/priest/minister: Rev Nigel Coke-Woods, minister (as at 2020)
Website:

Somers Park Avenue Methodist Church

Style of worship: Methodism
Location: Malvern Link
Founded on current  site: 1880s
Parish: South West Worcestershire Circuit
Built: Current building: 1936. Expanded 1960-61
Architecture: 
Bells:
Notable people in cemetery:
Current incumbent: Rev. Nigel Coke-Woods, minister (as at 2020)
Website: Somers Park Methodist

Non-Denominational

Life Church
Closed in 2021
Location: Meets at Malvern Vale Community Centre, Swinyard Road
Affiliation: Part of the New Frontiers Family of churches and Christ Central
Built: N/A
Architecture: N/A
Bells:N/A
Notable people in cemetery:N/A
Incumbent/Lead person: Immy Sharp, Children's and Community Worker
Website: New Frontiers

Christian Science
The Great Malvern Christian Science Society 
Location: Poolbrook Village Hall, Poolbrook Road, Malvern, WR14 3JW

Jehovah's Witnesses
Location: Kingdom Hall, 1 Orford Way, Malvern, WR14 2EH

Quakers

Friends Meeting House
Style of worship: resembles the services of other Protestant denominations, although in most cases does not include the Eucharist
Location: 1 Orchard Road, Malvern, WR14 3DA
Parish/Group: Worcestershire & Shropshire Area Meeting, Religious Society of Friends
Built: 1938. 
Architecture:  Designed by JR Armstrong, one of the Bournville Village architects.
Bells: N/A
Notable people in cemetery: N/A
Clerking Team: Elizabeth & Kevin Rolph and Melanie Jameson
Current vicar/priest/minister: Paul Wyatt, Judith Badman, Jill Etheridge, Richard Bartholomew (Elders)
Website: Malvern Quakers

The Salvation Army
Style of worship: Christian, various 
Location: 62 Newtown Road, Link Top, Malvern
Parish: N/A
Built: N/A
Architecture: N/A
Bells: N/A
Notable people in cemetery: N/A
Current vicar/priest/minister: Claire Mynott, Lieutenant (2022) 
Website: Salvation Army Malvern

Buddhist Temple
Bright Earth Temple
Location: 34 Worcester Road, Great Malvern
Built: 1820s as a guest house, acquired by Amida Trust, 2014
Style of worship: Mahayana Buddhism with emphasis on Pureland Buddhism.
Orientation:  Amidism - Bright Earth Buddhism, a broad branch of Mahayana.
Governance: Amida Trust
Affiliation: European Buddhist Union
Run/managed by: Amitabha Fellowship leaders  Kaspa and Satya
Website: Bright Earth Accessed 14 May 2022

References

Malvern, Worcestershire
Malvern Hills District
Buildings and structures in Malvern, Worcestershire
Religious buildings and structures in Worcestershire
Churches in Worcestershire
Methodist churches in the West Midlands (county)
Roman Catholic churches in Worcestershire